Welsh broadcaster and author Teleri Bevan (1931–2020; aged 88) was the founding editor of BBC Radio Wales. She was also the author of three nonfiction books including Esmé: Guardian of Snowdonia (2014), a biography of Welsh conservationist Esmé Kirby.

Early life and education 
Bevan was born near Aberystwyth in Wales in 1931. She later studied at Bangor University in Bangor, Wales.

Career

Journalism 
Bevan began working for the BBC in 1955, where she acted as a presenter, producer, and editor. In 1978, Bevan was named the first editor of BBC Radio Wales. Her appointment to the role was a source of controversy, with some criticizing her decision to cancel the popular program Good Morning Wales and replace it with a new morning program titled AM. However, Bevan eventually increased in popularity.

In 1981, Bevan became the deputy head of programs, and in 1985, she became the head of programs for BBC Wales.

Throughout her career, Bevan interviewed a wide variety of influential people, including Tom Jones and Indira Gandhi.

Literature 
After retiring from broadcasting, Bevan began a second career in nonfiction writing. In 2004, Bevan published a memoir of her broadcasting career titled Years on Air: Living with the BBC. Bevan's second book, The Ladies of Blaenwern (2010), told the history of the Welsh musical group The Dorian Trio, and was nominated for the January Book of the Month by the Welsh Books Council. In 2014, she published Esmé: Guardian of Snowdonia, a biography of Welsh conservationist Esmé Kirby.

Death 
Bevan died in November 2020.

References

Welsh women writers
Welsh women radio presenters
Welsh journalists
British women journalists
Welsh radio presenters
1931 births
2020 deaths